Dave Bowen (14 March 1886 – 2 August 1946) was an  Australian rules footballer who played with South Melbourne in the Victorian Football League (VFL).

Bowen was granted a permit from Subiaco in Western Australia to South Melbourne at the start of the 1908 VFL season but only made a single appearance before returning to Western Australia.

Notes

External links 

1886 births
1946 deaths
Australian rules footballers from Western Australia
Sydney Swans players